The 2017–18 Eastern Sports Club (basketball) season is the 2nd season of the franchise in the ASEAN Basketball League (ABL).

Roster

Standing

Elimination

Game log

|- style="background:#cfc;"
| 1
| November 19
| Tanduay Alab Pilipinas
| W 92-89 
| Christian Standhardinger (26)
| Christian Standhardinger (14)
| Marcus Ryan Elliott (9)
| Mall of Asia Arena
| 1–0

|- style="background:#cfc;"
| 2
| December 3
| CLS Knights Indonesia
| W 87-78 
| Tyler Lamb (25)
| Ryan O'Neil Moss (16)
| Marcus Ryan Elliott (6)
| GOR CLS Kertajaya
| 2–0
|- style="background:#cfc;"
| 3
| December 8
| Mono Vampire
| W 112-105 
| Christian Standhardinger (40)
| Christian Standhardinger (17)
| Marcus Ryan Elliott (9)
| Stadium 29
| 3–0
|- style="background:#cfc;"
| 4
| December 10
| Singapore Slingers
| W 81-77 
| Tyler Lamb (30)
| Standhardinger, Moss (10)
| Marcus Ryan Elliott (9)
| OCBC Arena Singapore
| 4–0
|- style="background:#cfc;"
| 5
| December 13
| Tanduay Alab Pilipinas
| W 99-96 
| Tyler Lamb (32)
| Christian Standhardinger (12)
| Marcus Ryan Elliott (7)
| Southorn Stadium
| 5–0
|- style="background:#cfc;"
| 6
| December 17
| Formosa Dreamers
| W 120-97 
| Tyler Lamb (22)
| Ryan O'Neal Moss (10)
| Marcus Ryan Elliott (13)
| Changhua Stadium
| 6–0
|- style="background:#cfc;"
| 7
| December 20
| Singapore Slingers
| W 82-79 
| Tyler Lamb (25)
| Christian Standhardinger (13)
| Marcus Ryan Elliott (8)
| Southorn Stadium
| 7–0

|- style="background:#fbb;"
| 8
| January 9
| Saigon Heat
| L 115-121 
| Christian Standhardinger (37)
| Christian Standhardinger (19)
| Marcus Ryan Elliott (10)
| Southorn Stadium
| 7–1
|- style="background:#cfc;"
| 9
| January 18
| Formosa Dreamers
| W 99-79 
| Standhardinger, Lamb (25)
| Marcus Ryan Elliott (11)
| Marcus Ryan Elliott (11)
| Southorn Stadium
| 8–1
|- style="background:#cfc;"
| 10
| January 24
| CLS Knights Indonesia
| W 104-81 
| Elliott, Lamb (23)
| Tyler Lamb (12)
| Elliott, Lamb (10)
| Southorn Stadium
| 9–1

|- style="background:#fbb;"
| 11
| February 4
| Saigon Heat
| L 115-118 
| Christian Standhardinger (31)
| Christian Standhardinger (18)
| Marcus Ryan Elliott (4)
| CIS Arena Saigon
| 9–2
|- style="background:#cfc;"
| 12
| February 8
| Westports Malaysia Dragons
| W 104-92 
| Tyler Lamb (28)
| Standhardinger, Elliott (11)
| Marcus Ryan Elliott (15)
| Southorn Stadium
| 10–2
|- style="background:#cfc;"
| 13
| February 13
| Chong Son Kung Fu
| W 88-76 
| Christian Standhardinger (23)
| Ryan O'Neal Moss (15)
| Marcus Ryan Elliott (8)
| Southorn Stadium
| 11–2
|- style="background:#cfc;"
| 14
| February 24
| Formosa Dreamers
| W 93-91 
| Marcus Ryan Elliott (31)
| Christian Standhardinger (10)
| Marcus Ryan Elliott (7)
| Changhua Stadium
| 12–2

|- style="background:#fcc;"
| 15
| March 9
| Chong Son Kung Fu
| L 85-94 
| Marcus Ryan Elliott (24)
| Christian Standhardinger (10)
| Tyler Lamb (5)
| Nanhai Gymnasium
| 12–3
|- style="background:#fcc;"
| 16
| March 13
| Chong Son Kung Fu
| L 76-87 
| Christian Standhardinger (24)
| Christian Standhardinger (12)
| Marcus Ryan Elliott (6)
| Nanhai Gymnasium
| 12–4
|- style="background:#fcc;"
| 17
| March 15
| Mono Vampire
| L 111–119 
| Tyler Lamb (32)
| Samuel Maltese Deguara (15)
| Jason Brickman (13)
| Southorn Stadium
| 12–5
|- style="background:#bfb;"
| 18
| March 22
| Formosa Dreamers
| W 99–93 
| Christian Standhardinger (33)
| Christian Standhardinger (15)
| Marcus Elliott (10)
| Southorn Stadium
| 13–5
|- style="background:#bfb;"
| 19
| March 25
| Westports Malaysia Dragons
| W 110–96 
| Lamb, Elliott (25)
| Christian Standhardinger (10)
| Marcus Elliott (10)
| MABA Stadium
| 14–5
|- style="background:#fcc;"
| 20
| March 28
| Chong Son Kung Fu
| L 77–88 
| Tyler Lamb (30)
| Christian Standhardinger (14)
| Marcus Elliott (5)
| Southorn Stadium
| 14–6

Playoffs

Game log 

|- style="background:#fcc;"
| 1
| April 11
| Tanduay Alab Pilipinas
| L 94–98 
| Tyler Lamb (32)
| Christian Standhardinger (15)
| Marcus Elliott (10)
| Southorn Stadium
| 0–1
|- style="background:#fcc;"
| 2
| April 15
| Tanduay Alab Pilipinas
| L 72–79 
| Tyler Lamb (25)
| Ryan O'Neil Moss (16)
| Elliott, Lee (3)
| Sta. Rosa Arena
| 0–2

Transactions

Recruited imports

References

Eastern Sports Club (basketball) seasons
Hong Kong Eastern Long Lions Season, 2017-18